Arcadia Lakes is a town in Richland County, South Carolina, United States. The population was 861 at the 2010 census. It is part of the Columbia, South Carolina, Metropolitan Statistical Area.

Geography

Demographics

2020 census

As of the 2020 United States census, there were 865 people, 370 households, and 225 families residing in the town.

2000 census
As of the census of 2000, there were 882 people, 379 households, and 278 families residing in the town. The population density was 1,685.6 people per square mile (654.9/km2). There were 389 housing units at an average density of 743.4 per square mile (288.8/km2). The racial makeup of the town was 94.90% White, 3.63% African American, 0.79% Asian, 0.23% from other races, and 0.45% from two or more races. Hispanic or Latino of any race were 0.79% of the population.

There were 379 households, out of which 24.8% had children under the age of 18 living with them, 66.8% were married couples living together, 4.7% had a female householder with no husband present, and 26.6% were non-families. 22.7% of all households were made up of individuals, and 10.8% had someone living alone who was 65 years of age or older. The average household size was 2.33 and the average family size was 2.72.

In the town, the population was spread out, with 20.2% under the age of 18, 3.1% from 18 to 24, 18.5% from 25 to 44, 34.6% from 45 to 64, and 23.7% who were 65 years of age or older. The median age was 49 years. For every 100 females, there were 97.3 males. For every 100 females age 18 and over, there were 89.2 males.

The median income for a household in the town was $66,382, and the median income for a family was $79,179. Males had a median income of $56,125 versus $35,682 for females. The per capita income for the town was $37,762. About 0.7% of families and 2.9% of the population were below the poverty line, including 2.1% of those under age 18 and none of those age 65 or over.

References

External links
 Town of Arcadia Lakes official website

Towns in Richland County, South Carolina
Towns in South Carolina
Columbia metropolitan area (South Carolina)